This list of mammals of Hungary shows the IUCN Red List status of mammal species occurring in Hungary. Two are endangered, seven are vulnerable, and four are near threatened.

The following tags are used to highlight each species' conservation status as assessed on the respective IUCN Red List published by the International Union for Conservation of Nature:

Order: Rodentia (rodents)

Rodents make up the largest order of mammals, with over 40% of mammalian species. They have two incisors in the upper and lower jaw which grow continually and must be kept short by gnawing. Most rodents are small though the capybara can weigh up to 45 kg (100 lb).

Suborder: Sciurognathi
Family: Castoridae (beavers)
Genus: Castor
 Eurasian beaver, C. fiber 
Family: Sciuridae (squirrels)
Subfamily: Sciurinae
Tribe: Sciurini
Genus: Sciurus
Red squirrel, S. vulgaris 
Subfamily: Xerinae
Tribe: Marmotini
Genus: Spermophilus
 European ground squirrel, Spermophilus citellus VU
Family: Gliridae (dormice)
Subfamily: Leithiinae
Genus: Dryomys
 Forest dormouse, Dryomys nitedula NT
Genus: Muscardinus
 Hazel dormouse, Muscardinus avellanarius NT
Subfamily: Glirinae
Genus: Glis
 European edible dormouse, Glis glis NT
Family: Dipodidae (jerboas)
Subfamily: Sicistinae
Genus: Sicista
 Southern birch mouse, Sicista subtilis NT
Family: Spalacidae
Subfamily: Spalacinae
Genus: Nannospalax
 Lesser mole rat, Nannospalax leucodon VU
Family: Cricetidae
Subfamily: Cricetinae
Genus: Cricetus
European hamster, C. cricetus 
Subfamily: Arvicolinae
Genus: Arvicola
 Water vole, Arvicola terrestris LC
Genus: Clethrionomys
 Bank vole, Clethrionomys glareolus LC
Genus: Microtus
 Field vole, Microtus agrestis LC
 Common vole, Microtus arvalis LC
 Tundra vole, Microtus oeconomus LC
 European pine vole, Microtus subterraneus LC
Genus: Ondatra
 Muskrat, Ondatra zibethicus LC introduced
Family: Muridae (mice, rats, voles, gerbils, hamsters, etc.)
Subfamily: Murinae
Genus: Apodemus
 Striped field mouse, Apodemus agrarius LC
 Yellow-necked mouse, Apodemus flavicollis LC
 Wood mouse, Apodemus sylvaticus LC
 Ural field mouse, Apodemus uralensis LC
Genus: Micromys
 Harvest mouse, Micromys minutus NT
Genus: Mus
 House mouse, Mus musculus LC introduced
 Steppe mouse, Mus spicilegus NT
Genus: Rattus
 Brown rat, Rattus norvegicus LC introduced
 Black rat, Rattus rattus LC introduced

Order: Lagomorpha (lagomorphs)

The lagomorphs comprise two families, Leporidae (hares and rabbits), and Ochotonidae (pikas). Though they can resemble rodents, and were classified as a superfamily in that order until the early 20th century, they have since been considered a separate order. They differ from rodents in a number of physical characteristics, such as having four incisors in the upper jaw rather than two.

Family: Leporidae (rabbits, hares)
Genus: Oryctolagus
European rabbit, O. cuniculus  introduced
Genus: Lepus
European hare, L. europaeus

Order: Erinaceomorpha (hedgehogs and gymnures)

The order Erinaceomorpha contains a single family, Erinaceidae, which comprise the hedgehogs and gymnures. The hedgehogs are easily recognised by their spines while gymnures look more like large rats.

Family: Erinaceidae (hedgehogs)
Subfamily: Erinaceinae
Genus: Erinaceus
 Northern white-breasted hedgehog, E. roumanicus

Order: Soricomorpha (shrews, moles, and solenodons)

The "shrew-forms" are insectivorous mammals. The shrews and solenodons closely resemble mice while the moles are stout-bodied burrowers.
Family: Soricidae (shrews)
Subfamily: Crocidurinae
Genus: Crocidura
 Bicolored shrew, Crocidura leucodon LC
 Lesser white-toothed shrew, Crocidura  suaveolens 
Subfamily: Soricinae
Tribe: Nectogalini
Genus: Neomys
 Southern water shrew, Neomys anomalus LC
 Eurasian water shrew, Neomys fodiens LC
Tribe: Soricini
Genus: Sorex
 Alpine shrew, Sorex alpinus LC
 Common shrew, Sorex araneus LC
 Eurasian pygmy shrew, Sorex minutus LC
Family: Talpidae (moles)
Subfamily: Talpinae
Tribe: Talpini
Genus: Talpa
 European mole, Talpa europaea LC

Order: Chiroptera (bats)

The bats' most distinguishing feature is that their forelimbs are developed as wings, making them the only mammals capable of flight. Bat species account for about 20% of all mammals.
Family: Vespertilionidae
Subfamily: Myotinae
Genus: Myotis
Bechstein's bat, M. bechsteini 
Lesser mouse-eared bat, M. blythii 
Brandt's bat, M. brandti 
Pond bat, M. dasycneme 
Daubenton's bat, M. daubentonii  
Geoffroy's bat, M. emarginatus 
Greater mouse-eared bat, M. myotis 
Whiskered bat, M. mystacinus 
Natterer's bat, M. nattereri 
Schaub's myotis, Myotis schaubi  extirpated
Subfamily: Vespertilioninae
Genus: Barbastella
Western barbastelle, B. barbastellus 
Genus: Eptesicus
 Northern bat, Eptesicus nilssoni LC
 Serotine bat, Eptesicus serotinus LC
Genus: Nyctalus
Greater noctule bat, N. lasiopterus 
Lesser noctule, N. leisleri 
Genus: Pipistrellus
Nathusius' pipistrelle, P. nathusii 
 Common pipistrelle, P. pipistrellus LC
Genus: Plecotus
Grey long-eared bat, P. austriacus 
Subfamily: Miniopterinae
Genus: Miniopterus
Common bent-wing bat, M. schreibersii 
Family: Molossidae
Genus: Tadarida
 European free-tailed bat, Tadarida teniotis LC
Family: Rhinolophidae
Subfamily: Rhinolophinae
Genus: Rhinolophus
Mediterranean horseshoe bat, R. euryale 
Greater horseshoe bat, R. ferrumequinum 
Lesser horseshoe bat, R. hipposideros

Order: Carnivora (carnivorans)

There are over 260 species of carnivorans, the majority of which feed primarily on meat. They have a characteristic skull shape and dentition.
Suborder: Feliformia
Family: Felidae (cats)
Subfamily: Felinae
Genus: Felis
 European wildcat, F. silvestris 
Genus: Lynx
Eurasian lynx, L. lynx 
Carpathian lynx L. l. carpathicus
Suborder: Caniformia
Family: Canidae (dogs, foxes)
Genus: Vulpes
 Red fox, V. vulpes 
Genus: Canis
 Gray wolf, C. lupus 
 Eurasian wolf, C. l. lupus
 Golden jackal, C. aureus 
 European jackal, C. a. moreoticus
Family: Mustelidae (mustelids)
Genus: Lutra
 European otter, L. lutra 
Genus: Martes
Beech marten, M. foina 
European pine marten, M. martes 
Genus: Meles
European badger, M. meles 
Genus: Mustela
Stoat, M. erminea 
Least weasel, M. nivalis 
European polecat, M. putorius 
Genus: Neogale
American mink, N. vison  presence uncertain, introduced

Order: Perissodactyla (odd-toed ungulates)

The odd-toed ungulates are browsing and grazing mammals. They are usually large to very large, and have relatively simple stomachs and a large middle toe.

Family: Equidae (horses etc.)
Genus: Equus
 Wild horse, E. ferus  reintroduced
 Przewalski's horse, E. f. przewalskii  reintroduced

Order: Artiodactyla (even-toed ungulates)

The even-toed ungulates are ungulates whose weight is borne about equally by the third and fourth toes, rather than mostly or entirely by the third as in perissodactyls. There are about 220 artiodactyl species, including many that are of great economic importance to humans.
Family: Cervidae (deer)
Subfamily: Capreolinae
Genus: Alces
Moose, A. alces  
Genus: Capreolus
Roe deer, C. capreolus 
Subfamily: Cervinae
Genus: Cervus
Red deer, C. elaphus 
Genus: Dama
 European fallow deer, D. dama LC introduced
Family: Suidae (pigs)
Subfamily: Suinae
Genus: Sus
Wild boar, S. scrofa

Locally extinct
 European bison, Bison bonasus
 European mink, Mustela lutreola
 Brown bear, Ursus arctos

See also

 List of birds of Hungary
 List of reptiles of Hungary
 List of amphibians of Hungary 
 List of chordate orders
 Lists of mammals by region
List of prehistoric mammals
Mammal classification
List of mammals described in the 2000s

References

External links

Hungary
Mammals
Mammals
Hungary